Charles A. Corbett (November 21, 1840 – February 18, 1915) was an American businessman and politician.

Born in Benson, Rutland County, Vermont, Corbett and his parents moved to a farm in the town of Greenbush, Wisconsin in 1855. Corbett served in the 8th Wisconsin Volunteer Infantry Regiment during the American Civil War and lost a leg in a battle. Corbett then went to a business school in Milwaukee, Wisconsin and operated a store in the town of Forest, Fond du Lac County, Wisconsin. Corbett then returned to Greenbush, Wisconsin and operated another store. During that time, Corbett served as Greenbush town clerk and town board chairman. He also served in the Wisconsin State Assembly, in 1889, and was a Republican. In 1898, Corbett moved to Plymouth, Wisconsin. He died at his home in Plymouth, Wisconsin.

Notes

1840 births
1915 deaths
People from Benson, Vermont
People from Forest, Fond du Lac County, Wisconsin
People from Plymouth, Wisconsin
People of Wisconsin in the American Civil War
Businesspeople from Wisconsin
Mayors of places in Wisconsin
Republican Party members of the Wisconsin State Assembly
19th-century American politicians
19th-century American businesspeople